The Basilica of Christ the King is a Roman Catholic parish church located in Paola, Malta.

History
The parish of Paola or as it more commonly known as Raħal Ġdid, was created in 1910 by Archbishop Pietro Pace. The 17th century St. Ubaldesca Church was chosen as the parish church. Plans were made for a larger church to be built. In 1924 the cornerstone was laid by the stone mason Vincenzo Costa who lived in Rangu Street at the nearby village of Hal Luqa, and thus construction commenced. Sometime in the late 1920s or early 1930s, stonework was being done by Manuel and his brother Carmnu Cassar. Photographs exist showing Manuel and Carmnu Cassar erecting the arches. The formwork and the hoist to erect the arches are still in the basement of the church. Manuel Cassar was the son of Joseph Cassar also a stone mason and builder who built many houses in Paola. Joseph Cassar was from the neighbouring town of Tarxien. Manuel Cassar was married to Carmena who was from the town of Mellieha. They lived in Triq il-Qalb ta Ġesù; an adjacent street to the church. Manuel and Carmena Cassar had seven children, Maria Cassar being the eldest heard many a story from her father about what was going on during that time and until the war started. The church started to be used as the parish church 1936. The church was consecrated and dedicated to Christ the King on June 3, 1967 by Archbishop Mikiel Gonzi.   

On 5 April 2020 a decree was signed in the Vatican, by virtue of which this Church was raised to the dignity of a Minor Basilica.

References

Paola, Malta
National Inventory of the Cultural Property of the Maltese Islands
Limestone churches in Malta
Residential buildings completed in 1936
20th-century Roman Catholic church buildings in Malta
Christ